This article is about music-related events in 1823.

Events 
April 13 – According to his official biographer, Gustav Schilling, eleven-year-old Franz Liszt gives a concert after which he is personally congratulated by Ludwig van Beethoven; however, there is no record of Beethoven having attended the concert.
May 8 - The most famous song of the nineteenth century Home, Sweet Home was sung for the first time in London. (melody by Englishman Sir Henry Bishop, lyrics by John Howard Payne. 
August 12 – Hector Berlioz writes to the journal Le Corsaire defending Gaspare Spontini's opera La vestale.
Gioachino Rossini arrives in London and is presented to King George IV.
The arpeggione is invented by Viennese guitar maker Johann Georg Staufer.
Soprano Henriette Méric-Lalande catches the attention of the critic Castil-Blaze, who introduces her to the famous tenor Manuel García, thereby advancing her career.
Franz Liszt is denied entry into the Paris Conservatory by the Director, Luigi Cherubini, who states that he cannot admit foreigners.

Classical music 
Christian Frederik Barth – Oboe Concerto, Op.12
Ludwig van Beethoven  
Diabelli Variations, Op. 120
Missa Solemnis, Op. 123
Vincenzo Bellini – Oboe Concerto in E-flat major
Hector Berlioz – Amitié, reprends ton empire, H 10b
Ferdinando Carulli – Duos Nocturnes, Op. 189
Carl Czerny – Toccata, Op. 92
Louis Ferdinand, Prince of Prussia – Rondo, Op. 13
Mauro Giuliani – 6 Variations, Op. 112
Mikhail Glinka – Andante Cantabile and Rondo
Johann Nepomuk Hummel 
Nocturne, theme et variations, Op. 99
Introduction, theme et variations, Op. 102
Friedrich Wilhelm Kalkbrenner – Piano Concerto No. 1, Op. 61
August Alexander Klengel – Piano Trio, Op. 36
Ernst Krähmer – Variations brillantes, Op. 18
Franz Krommer 
Flute Quintet, Op. 101
Symphony No. 6 in D
Friedrich Kuhlau 
3 Flute Quintets, Op. 51
6 Sonatinas, Op. 55
Giovanni Morandi – Raccolta di sonate per gli organi moderni No.4
George Onslow 
Piano Trio No. 7, Op. 20
Grand Sonata No. 2, Op. 22
String Quintets Nos.7-9, Opp. 23–25
Ferdinand Ries 
Symphony Nos. 4 and 5, Opp. 110 and 112
Introduction et rondeau sur une danse russe, Op. 113, No. 1
Piano Sonata, Op. 114
Cello Sonata No. 4 in G minor, Op. 125
Christian Heinrich Rinck – 12 Adagios for Organ, Op. 57
Bernhard Romberg – Cello Concerto No. 5, Op. 30
Franz Schubert –
Die Schöne Müllerin
Drang in die Ferne, D. 770
Der Zwerg, D.771
Wehmut, D.772
Auf dem Wasser zu singen, D. 774
Louis Spohr 
Potpourri on Irish Themes, Op. 59
String Quartet No.18, Op. 61

Stage Works 
Gaetano Donizetti – Alfredo il grande
Mary Fauche – The Shepherd King, Op.1
Saverio Mercadante – Didone abbandonata
Gioachino Rossini – Semiramide
Franz Schubert 
Fierrabras
Rosamunde
Carl Maria von Weber – Euryanthe

Popular Music 
 "Home! Sweet Home!" w. John Howard Payne m. Henry Bishop

Publications
Alling Brown – The Gamut, or Scale of Music (New Haven: A. H. Maltby and Co.)
Thomas Busby – A Musical Manual (London: Goulding & D'Almaine)
Emanuel Aloys Förster – Anleitung zum General-Baß
Philippe Marc Antoine Geslin – Exposition de la gamme (Paris)

Births 
January 1 – Sándor Petőfi, lyricist (died 1849)
January 3 – Jacques-Nicolas Lemmens, organist and composer (died 1881)
January 5 – William Smith Rockstro, musicologist and musician (died 1895)
January 21 – Alexandre Édouard Goria, pianist and composer (died 1860)
January 27 – Édouard Lalo, composer (died 1892)
June 2 – Carl Christian Møller, composer (died 1893)
June 30 – Selmar Bagge, composer (died 1896)
July 22 – Paulina Rivoli, operatic soprano (died 1881)
August 3 – Francisco Ansenjo Barbieri, composer (died 1894)
August 14 – Karel Miry, Belgian composer (died 1889)
August 15 – Léon Gastinel, French composer (died 1906)
August 16 – Adolphe Herman, composer (died 1903)
August 17 – Theodor Julius Jaffé, opera singer and actor (died 1898)
October 21 – Emilio Arrieta, composer (died 1894)
October 28 – William Spark, musician (died 1897)
November 4 – Karel Komzák I, composer and conductor (died 1893)
November 26 – Thomas Tellefsen, pianist and composer (died 1874)
December 1 – Ernest Reyer, opera composer and music critic (died 1909)
December 10 – Theodor Kirchner, composer and musician (died 1903)
December 11 – David Bennett, Canadian soldier and musician (died 1902)
date unknown – John Diamond, dancer and minstrel (died 1857)

Deaths 
February 16 – Johann Gottfried Schicht, conductor and composer (born 1753)
March 1 – Pierre-Jean Garat, singer (born 1764)
March 18 – Jean-Baptiste Breval, French cellist and composer (born 1753)
April – Jacques Widerkehr, Alsatian composer (born 1759)
April 15 – Louis Deland, actor, singer and dancer (born 1772)
June 20 – Theodor von Schacht, German composer (born 1748)
October 2 – Daniel Steibelt, German pianist and composer (born 1765)
November 12 – Emanuel Aloys Förster, composer and music teacher (born 1748)
date unknown – Federigo Fiorillo, composer and musician (born 1755)

References

 
19th century in music
Music by year